Hester is a small town in the South West region of Western Australia, 7 km north of Bridgetown on the railway.

It was gazetted a townsite in 1899, and was originally a siding on the Donnybrook to Bridgetown railway, opened in 1898. The town derives its name from the nearby Hester Brook, a name first recorded by surveyor John Forrest in 1866. Hester Brook is named after Edward Godfrey Hester, an early settler (late 1850s) of the Bridgetown district.

References

Towns in Western Australia
South West (Western Australia)